Kachkanar is a town in Sverdlovsk Oblast, Russia, located between the Isa and Vyya Rivers in the Tura River's basin,  north of Yekaterinburg, the administrative center of the oblast. Population:

Administrative and municipal status
Within the framework of the administrative divisions, it is, together with two rural localities, incorporated as the Town of Kachkanar—an administrative unit with the status equal to that of the districts. As a municipal division, the Town of Kachkanar is incorporated as Kachkanarsky Urban Okrug.

Economy and transportation
There is an open-pit mine to the north.

Twin towns and sister cities
Kachkanar is a sister city of:

  Sëlva, Italy
  Maladzyechna, Belarus

References

Notes

Sources

External links

Official website of Kachkanar 
Kachkanar Business Directory 

Cities and towns in Sverdlovsk Oblast
Cities and towns built in the Soviet Union